Marriage of Convenience is a 1960 British crime film directed by Clive Donner and starring Harry H. Corbett, John Cairney and John Van Eyssen. Part of the long-running series of Edgar Wallace Mysteries films made at Merton Park Studios, it is based on the 1924 novel The Three Oak Mystery.

Cinema release
Marriage of Convenience was the first of the Edgar Wallace series to be allocated to the Rank circuit for general release. It went out as support for Man in the Moon from January 15th 1961.

Synopsis
A convict escapes from jail, only to discover that his girlfriend has married the police officer who arrested him.

Cast
 Harry H. Corbett as Inspector Bruce 
 John Cairney as Larry 
 John Van Eyssen as John Mandle 
 Jennifer Daniel as Barbara Blair
 Moira Redmond as Tina 
 Russell Waters as Sam Spencer 
 Trevor Reid as Superintendent Carver 
 Howard Goorney as Onion Seller 
 Alexander Archdale as Governor 
 Geoffrey Denton as Uniformed Inspector 
 Patrick Ludlow as Registrar 
 Barry MacLean as 1st. Warder 
 Basil Beale as 2nd. Warder 
 Alex Scott as Vic Ellis 
 Patricia Burke as Woman in the Apartment 
 Pauline Shepherd as Evie Martin 
 Leila Williams as Secretary 
 Duncan Burns as Garage Apprentice 
 Trevor Maskell as Sergeant Collins

References

Bibliography
 Goble, Alan. The Complete Index to Literary Sources in Film. Walter de Gruyter, 1999.

External links

1960 films
British crime films
1960 crime films
1960s English-language films
Films set in England
Merton Park Studios films
Films directed by Clive Donner
Films based on British novels
Edgar Wallace Mysteries
1960s British films